Michałowicz is a Polish-language patronymic surname derived from the first name Michał,  Polish form of "Michael". Notable people with this surname include:

Mieczysław Michałowicz (1876-1965), Polish social and political activist, physician, and professor at Warsaw University
Mike Michalowicz (born 1970), American author, entrepreneur, and lecturer

See also
Mihajlović

Polish-language surnames
Patronymic surnames
Surnames from given names